World Service is the third studio album by Spear of Destiny, released by Epic Records in 1985.

Track listing
All songs written by Kirk Brandon

Side one
 "Rocket Ship" - 4:41
 "Up All Night" - 3:11
 "Come Back" - 3:36
 "World Service" - 4:33
 "I Can See" - 4:24
Side two
 "All My Love (Ask Nothing)" - 3:44
 "Mickey" - 6:20
 "Somewhere in the East" - 3:24
 "Once in Her Lifetime" - 5:31
 "Harlan County" - 3:53

Personnel
Spear of Destiny
Kirk Brandon - vocals, guitar
Stan Stammers - bass guitar
Dolphin Taylor - drums, percussion
Neil Pyzer - grand and electric piano, organ, alto and tenor saxophone
Mickey Donnelly - alto and tenor saxophone, clarinet, flute
Alan St. Clair - guitar
with:
Barbara Pennington - backing vocals on B4
Mae McKenna, Lorenza Johnson, Jackie Challenor - backing vocals on A2, B1, B4
Simon Gardener, Steve Sidwell - trumpet on A2, B4
Steve Sidwell - flugelhorn on B4
Technical
Adam Moseley - engineer
Adam Moseley, Clive Martin, Rusty Egan - mixing

References

1985 albums
Epic Records albums
Spear of Destiny (band) albums
Albums recorded at Trident Studios